In the 2020s, LGBTQ representation in animated series and animated films became more pronounced than it had in the 2010s, or 2000s when it came to Western animation. This included series like The Owl House, Harley Quinn, Adventure Time: Distant Lands,  RWBY, and Dead End: Paranormal Park.  Series like She-Ra and the Princesses of Power, Steven Universe Future, The Hollow, and Kipo and the Age of Wonderbeasts, which had various LGBTQ characters, came to an end in 2020, and Gen:Lock came to an end in 2021. An upcoming season of Hazbin Hotel was hinted at, while an animated adaption of Lumberjanes was in development.

Trends
In 2020–2021 GLAAD report, DuckTales was described as featuring two dads in an episode, with some episodes centering on "an alien named Penumbra" who the episodes' director and writer confirmed as a lesbian, and the show The Owl House was noted as making headlines for a bisexual character named Luz, and her crush, Amity, who is lesbian, who have a "romantic storyline." GLAAD described The Loud House as featuring Luna Loud, a bisexual character, and Summy, her girlfriend, along with Howard and Harold McBride, "the two Dads of the protagonist’s best friend Clyde."

GLAAD pointed to a few series on the platform like Harley Quinn, with Harley Quinn as bisexual and had a growing relationship with Poison Ivy, Doom Patrol which has a gay man named Larry Trainor/Negative Man and a character, Danny, who uses they/them pronouns, and Young Justice which features "LGBTQ characters Aqualad and Halo." GLAAD also pointed out that the streamer aired an episode of Adventure Time: Distant Lands which focuses "on queer couple Bubblegum and Marceline" and the announcement that an animated series based on Lumberjanes was ordered. It is worth noting that Young Justice is a young adult animation, while Doom Patrol is for adults and Adventure Time: Distant Lands is for all-ages.

In August 2021, Insider found in their analysis of 259 LGBTQ cartoon characters stretching back to the 1980s, that "only 10 out of just 70 identified people of color...had leading roles" and a significant proportion lacked "explicit racial specificity," with what the writers called a "fictional combinations of real-world cultures" and had a mix of "nonhuman racial metaphors," which young children wouldn't understand. In September 2021, Abbey White, one of the writers of the Insider article, said in The Hollywood Reporter's "Hollywood Remixed" podcast that children's animation is "arguably at the forefront of our conversations about non-binary identity and gender non-conforming identities," breaking down gender binaries reinforced in the media, and noted the animated series which are stepping up, even when it comes to non-binary characters. They also noted even adult animation has "gay, trans, non-binary characters."

Animation for adults
Adult animation series in the 2020s include Magical Girl Friendship Squad: Origins, Magical Girl Friendship Squad, Castlevania, The Hollow, Disenchantment, Harley Quinn, Duncanville The Great North, HouseBroken, Star Trek: Lower Decks, Solar Opposites, M.O.D.O.K., Tuca & Bertie, and Rick and Morty, all of which have LGBTQ characters. However, series such as Hoops and The Venture Bros. were cancelled, while LGBTQ characters appeared in indie animations such as Ollie and Scoops and Helluva Boss. They premiered on SYFY's TZGZ, Netflix, DC Universe, HBO Max, Fox, YouTube, and elsewhere.

Magical Girl Friendship Squad and Syfy

On January 1, Magical Girl Friendship Squad: Origins entered the fray and premiered on Syfy. Six episodes of the adult animation, inspired by Sailor Moon and other magical girl anime, began airing on Syfy. The series, written by Diana McCorry who created Human Kind Of, features two women, Alex and Daisy, with the latter a lesbian who sleeps with a woman during the show.

The series appeared in a new iteration on September 26, named Magical Girl Friendship Squad, with some new cast members and longer episodes. In the latter show, Daisy is unambiguously queer as she has slept with "every barista" at the local coffee shop. In the second and third episodes of the main show, "The Cool S" and "Agony Solstice", a sticker with the transgender pride flag is shown on Daisy's laptop. She is later shown to have an ex-girlfriend in the fourth episode, "Anti-Fungal Spit Skanks," a classic-style anime character, named Yolanda, who works at urgent care center in the city. In the episode "The Real World," Pansy, who calls herself Daisy's "monogamous live-in girlfriend" is introduced, but she only exists in the dimension created by Nut's sister, Gloriana.

On November 1, 2020, Hallie Cantor, a writer for the show, responded to a question on whether Daisy is trans, stated that they hadn't yet "identified her as trans or cis," meaning that she could either be a cisgender lesbian or trans lesbian. On December 4, 2020, Krystal Downs, director for Magical Girl Friendship Squad said that Daisy is lesbian in a tweet. However, Anna Akana, who voiced Daisy, said that Daisy is a cisgender bisexual woman like herself, and dismissed comments by fans saying that Daisy was transgender, saying that implication was incorrect.

Castlevania, Disechantment and beyond

In March 2020, one of the series directors of Castlevania, Sam Deats, confirmed that Alucard was bisexual and Taka as gay. In the view of Vanity Fair, casually queer characters were "part of the story’s fabric from the very beginning."

On May 8, 2020, the second season of The Hollow, which premiered in May 2019, aired. The first episode of that season, titled "Home," features one of the show's protagonists, an Asian girl named Mira, was shown to be adopted by her two fathers, Paul and Curtis, and a brother named Miles.  Curtis is a Black man, while Paul is a White man. Paul also appear in two other episodes "Race," "Hollow Games," while Curtis only appears in "Race." The second episode featured a Hispanic boy named Adam, who was revealed to homosexual, saying that Mira, a female protagonist, is "not his type" and telling Kai "dude, I'm gay." Prior to this, in the trailer for Season 2 the LGBT pride flag was seen in his room, leading some fans to speculate he was gay. Some critics stated that while this was somewhat clear in season one, there is little or no "romantic entanglement" for the show's characters in the show's second season, with the show focusing on "difficult and dramatic friendships" instead. The show was cancelled on August 31, 2020.

On December 12, 2020, a mature adult animation, Hoops was cancelled by Netflix after its first season received low ratings and negative reviews. Hoops was described as "puerile comedy ... perfect for Trump's America," not funny, and "crude, rude, and aimless." The animation had a gay character named Scott on the school's basketball team.

On January 15, 2021, Part 3 of Disenchantment was released on Netflix. David Opie of Digital Spy said that the series is different from The Simpsons and doing something that the latter series "struggled with for over three decades." Opie observed that some LGBTQ+ fans from the beginning of the show picked up "on some queer vibes" and it later teased that Bean, voiced by Abbi Jacobson, might be flirting with people of the same sex as her," but then in part 3 of the show, in the episode "Last Splash," it was confirmed that Bean "is indeed queer" and that she likes mermaids, talking with Mora, a mermaid. She talks with Mora about "past relationships, science, history, daily life, and a variety of other topics." Another pop culture reviewer, Burkely Hermann, concurred with Opie, but saw deeper queer themes throughout the show. This includes a married woman casually admitting she is a lesbian, a griffin who has a masculine appearance but is a lady, a homosexual relationship between two supporting characters (Odval and Sorcerio), along with an implied relationship between two others. Lady Bowmore, a female explorer in the steampunk city of Steamland, is described as liking Bean and that she likes her back. Hermann disagrees with Opie's argument about the storyline with Mora, noting that Bean says that the time with Mora was "so hot I didn’t even care about the sand" and argues the show is a step forward for Matt Groening when it comes to "inclusive storytelling."

Jacobson later voiced a queer protagonist, Katie, in the April 2021 animated film, The Mitchells vs. the Machines. In the film, Katie wears a rainbow pride flag pin and talks about it taking a while to figure herself out, and at the end of the film, she has a girlfriend at film school in Los Angeles named Jade.

On September 2, 2021, Netflix released an adult animated comedy series called Q-Force, about a group of undervalued LGBT superspies, and is centered on a gay secret agent who is like James Bond, Steve Maryweather (also known as Agent Mary), as they try to prove themselves on personal and professional adventures. The series received mixed reviews from critics. The review aggregator website Rotten Tomatoes reported a 25% approval rating with an average rating of 3.2/10, based on 12 reviews. The website's critics consensus reads, "Q-Forces heart is in the right place, but dated stereotypes and a general lack of humor make this animated action adventure fall flat." Metacritic, which uses a weighted average, assigned a score of 45 out of 100 based on 7 critics, indicating "mixed or average reviews".

Harley Quinn and DC Universe
On May 15, 2020 Harley Quinn episode "There's No Place to Go But Down" premiered. In the episode, Harley Quinn saved her partner-in-crime, Poison Ivy, both kissed each other after they escaped from prison. The critic who reviewed the episode stated that Harley and Poison's romance is "slow burn" one, adding that this love affair could turn into a "more realistic exploration of how it feels to fall in love with a friend or to have an awkward hookup with a workmate." In another episode, Clayface, a member of Harley's  villain crew, was revealed as gay character who had a crush on a male student.

In June 2020, the season 2 finale of Harley Quinn aired. In the episode, Poison Ivy had her wedding with Kite Man, a person she didn't love, interrupted. By the end of the episode, Harley Quinn and Ivy realize their feelings for each other, kissing and "finally embracing that they're soul mates" as Renaldo Metadeen of CBR put it. Heather Hogan at Autostraddle added that the bisexual love of Poison and Harley is canon, calling the second season "one of the most gratifying gay seasons of television" she has ever watched.

On June 18, 2020, Batgirl, Wonder Woman and a number of other heroes from DC Comics appeared in an image posted on the Twitter account of DC Kids for pride month.

Cancellation of The Venture Bros.
In September 2020, The Venture Bros., which had been slated to be renewed for an eighth and final season was cancelled. This was first asserted by show illustrator Ken Plume on September 5, then later confirmed by series creator Jackson Publick, with season 8 being axed. On September 7, 2020, Adult Swim stated that they were working to "find another way to continue the Venture Bros. story"."

The show had featured LGBTQ characters like openly gay Colonel Horace Gentleman, a lesbian character named Virginia "Ginnie" Dunne, and a gay couple: The Alchemist and Shore Leave. A number of creators weighed in on the decision. For instance, Owl House creator Dana Terrace criticized the cancellation, as did animator Bryan Brinkman, DuckTales producer Frank Angones, and other fans of the show.

On May 12, 2021, it was announced that it will have a direct-to-video film continuation.

YouTube and independent animations
In September 2020, independent animator Vivienne Medrano had expressed support in shipping two male characters in an animated short featuring characters from a webcomic she worked on, titled ZooPhobia, after Benjamin Diskin shipped them together.

On October 21, 2020, the Ollie and Scoops episode "Tutor Suitor," displayed an anxious Ms. Bellie Bivvins has a crush on a science teacher, Ms. Wendy Whippleworth. In the episode, they both get together in the end, with the help of the series protagonists Ollie and Scoops. Series creator Nico Colaleo, who had created Too Loud a few years before, described how Bellie wanted to tell "her crush how she feels" with butterflies from her tummy as the "physical manifestation of her anxiety" and praised fan art of Bellie and Wendy.

On October 31, 2020, the first season of Medrano's Helluva Boss would be released on YouTube. Helluva Boss has various LGBTQ characters, specifically a bisexual demon named Moxxie, and a pansexual demon named Blitzo. Stolas is also presumably bisexual as he is married with a wife and a daughter, but also has sex with Blitzo.

Duncanville, The Great North, and Fox
On February 16, 2020, Duncanville began broadcasting on Fox. The show would feature the protagonist, Duncan, having a crush on his reportedly genderfluid classmate, Mia, who works at a pizzeria and sticks her finger in each pizza to "silently protest the company’s anti-gay stance." On March 22, the show would reportedly have an unnamed gay couple in episode "Sister, Wife." The show was later described as part of a new respect by FOX for "female-led adult cartoons," along with Bless the Harts, The Great North, and HouseBroken.

In January 2021, the adult animated sitcom titled The Great North began airing on Fox. One of the characters, Ham Tobin, played by Paul Rust, is the middle son of Beef Tobin and is openly gay. Ham is a teen trying to find his place in the world and comes out to his family as gay, even though he did so in the past. Also, Crispin Cienfuegos is a teen who works at a smoothie bar. Judy originally had a crush on him until the episode "Pride & Prejudance Adventure" when it is revealed that Crispin is gay and is into Judy's brother Ham. He and Ham became a couple. Crispin is voiced by gay actor Julio Torres.

Star Trek: Lower Decks

On October 8, 2020, the creator of Star Trek: Lower Decks, which aired on CBS All Access, Mike McMahan confirmed that Captain Amina Ramsey was Beckett Mariner's former lover at Starfleet Academy, even though it wasn't explicit, saying that "every Starfleet officer is probably at the baseline bisexual" in a sense, and that they did not "intentionally mean for anybody to be strictly heteronormative or straight or cis." However, he promised to do better in the show's second season, saying they would dig into it more, saying that the show could, in the future, more explicitly state "things that the writers always knew about Mariner."

In the season 2 episode of Star Trek: Lower Decks, "We'll Always Have Tom Paris", which aired on August 26, 2021, Mariner tells Tendi that she has dated "bad boys, bad girls, bad gender non-binary babes, [and] ruthless alien masterminds," meaning that she could be pansexual. In the September 23, 2021 episode, "Where Pleasant Fountains Lie," it is implied that Andy Billups, who works as the chief engineer aboard the U.S.S. Cerritos, and the prince of Hysperia is asexual because he had no interest in having sex with either the male guard or the female guard. One reviewer argued that the show itself has LGBTQ representation at its center, mostly focusing on Mariner, but also on Billups, noted an interview where Boimler's voice actor Jack Quaid said that his character could be queer, noted the role of Jennifer Sh’reyan in the show's season two finale, and connected it other LGBTQ representation in the Star Trek franchise.

In October 2021 interview with Gizmodo, McMahan said that Mariner and Sh’reyan, a woman shown in the Season two finale, would be dating in the show's third season. He said that this fits with Mariner beginning to open up more as her character develops through the show.

Other adult animations
In early December 2020, a 2D-animated series titled "Highlands Shadow," directed by Paula Boffo and produced by Ojo Raro, was premiered at Ventana Sur's Animation! This eight episode long series aims at a young adult audience, addresses "gender and LGBTIQ+ issues," by focusing on Juana, "a girl from Humahuaca whose sister Marisol has been captured by a human trafficking cartel," who allies with "two haunted machetes" and becomes a superheroine.

In March 2021, the creators of Hulu's Solar Opposites, Justin Roiland and Mike McMahan, confirmed that Korvo and Terry are a romantic couple in a committed relationship. Roiland also described both as genderless aliens which asexually reproduce but are not asexual. In the same month, The series Invincible features William Clockwell, Mark Grayson's best friend, has a crush on Mark's dad Omni-Man. He is voiced by gay actor Andrew Rannells. In the episode "You Look Kinda Dead", he visits Upstate University for the weekend to visit Rick Sheridan, his ex-boyfriend who turns into a cyborg called an "Reaniman" by young mad scientist D.A. Sinclair.

On April 27, 2021, the voice actor of Melissa Tartleton, on Hulu's M.O.D.O.K., Melissa Fumero, said that her bisexuality of the character she voices would have been explored in the show's second season, including the introduction of her girlfriend. However, the series was cancelled after one season in May 2022.

On June 13, 2021, the second season of Tuca & Bertie began airing on Adult Swim. The first season had premiered on Netflix in May 2019. Tuca is a female anthropomorphic toucan who has shown interest in both men and women. In the Season 2 premiere "Bird Mechanics", she is shown making out with a woman. From the episode "Nighttime Friend" on, she tries to get into a serious relationship with a woman named Kara. However they break up in the Season 2 finale "The Flood". Some reviewers called the cartoon "imaginative," and has gender parity in its writers room, while the two protagonists, Bertie and Tuca try to "build a healthier relationship with one another."

In the first episode of Season 5 of Rick and Morty, which aired on June 20, 2021, it was confirmed that the father of Morty, Jerry Smith, is queer because he, and Beth, his wife, have a threesome with the King of the Ocean, otherwise known as Mr. Nimbus. Jerry has feelings for Mr. Nimbus, and due to the fact he has a wife, it means he is either pansexual or bisexual, with both he and Beth in a "sex-positive place" in their relationship, according to Jerry's voice actor, Chris Parnell. The fact he is queer was already hinted in the episode "Total Rickall."

On September 17, 2021, Chicago Party Aunt began airing on Netflix. In this animated adaptation of the Twitter account of the same name, Daniel,  Diane Dubrowski's nephew, foregoes going to Stanford University and spends a "Gap Year" instead, and had just realized that he is gay. The series also features Gideon, Diane's boss at Borough. His mother is unaware that he is gay. Gideon is voiced by drag queen RuPaul Charles.

On October 29, 2021, Jackson Publick, the creator of The Venture Bros., shared an image of the script for an upcoming film based on the series which is entitled "Long-form Special."

On November 7, 2021, Arcane, aimed at a "16+" audience like the League of Legends video game it is based on, premiered on Netflix. In the series, Caitlyn Kiramman, a recurring character, is attracted to Vi, a woman from the undercity, despite their different circumstances. Show writer Amanda Overton said that the relationship between Caitlyn and Vi is "naturally developing," with writers honoring the lived experiences of both characters. Overton said that in Piltover, where Caitlyn lives, there is no word for describing those who are gay or any homophobia, meaning that Caitlyn could "marry any gender or race suitor," with such a person becoming "part of her house." Additionally, in the episode "Everybody Wants to Be My Enemy", Vi tells Caitlyn "you’re hot, Cupcake." Overton said that this line was added to bring clarity to her character and showed that she loves women. Vi later moves in with Caitlyn, and in the show's ninth episode, Vi's sister, Jinx, describes Caitlyn as Vi's girlfriend. The show was renewed for a second season on November 20.

Santa Inc., which premiered on HBO Max on December 2, 2021, featured Goldie, an openly bisexual reindeer who is a member of Santa Claus' "B-Team".

On January 28, 2022, The Legend of Vox Machina, based on campaign one of the Dungeons & Dragons web series Critical Role, started airing on Amazon Prime Video. It features LGBTQ characters like the twins Vex'ahlia "Vex" and Vax'ildan "Vax" Vessar, who are both bisexual, along with Keyleth of the Air Ashari and Scanlan Shorthalt who are queer.

Young adult animation
The 2020s would see the continuation and premiere of young adult animated series on RoosterTeeth, Netflix, and other platforms. This included LGBTQ characters in RWBY, Kipo and the Age of Wonderbeasts, She-Ra and the Princesses of Power, The Dragon Prince and a gay coded character in Rapunzel's Tangled Adventure.

Recorded by Arizal and RWBY
On September 21, 2020, Yssa Badiola of Recorded by Arizal hosted a RTX panel with Christine Marie Cabanos, Joshua Kazemi, and Kdin Jenzen, the latter who moderated. Toward the end of the panel, Jenzen asked about LGBTQ characters in the show. Badiola said that if there was a full season, while Arizal's sexuality (and gender) would be explored, and that there were a "lot" of LGBTQ characters in a "show proper" they originally pitched.

On December 26, 2020, Kdin Jenzen, the voice actor for May Marigold, talked about confirmation of May as trans on screen in the December 19, 2020 RWBY episode, "War",  the eighth episode of Volume 8 of RWBY. "I think my favorite part of May Marigold's story, overall, is that she found herself before she found herself," Jenzen, who is a trans woman herself, told CBR in January 2021.

Kipo and She-Ra
Kipo and the Age of Wonderbeasts aired on Netflix from January to October 2020. It became a shining example of expanded representation. In the first season of Kipo, which streamed on January 10, Benson said outright he was gay, saying he only liked the series protagonist, Kipo, in a platonic way. He developed a crush on a male character, Troy, in the show's 10th episode. Gizmodo described the show as having "casual queerness." Benson has been described as the "first kids' animated character to directly identify as gay in dialogue." In August 2021, Insider said that Benson became the "first Black lead character, and only the second-known animated kids character" apart from a character in 6teen to identify "as gay in dialogue." Sechrist also hinted at Troy being pansexual, but it was never confirmed in the show.

On May 15, 2020, the final season of She-Ra and the Princesses of Power premiered on Netflix. The stakes were higher than ever before, with more danger than the previous season, according to Stevenson, as the season has "a core of optimism to it" with the characters discovering who "they are and following the path that each of them has." In an interview with Nerdist, Stevenson said that she wanted to represent points of view not usually seen in media, trying to explore them while being as "honest and as real as possible," adding that while crafting queer representation is different from "studio to studio, show to show," recommending that people who want such representation have to approach it "without any fear," saying that sometimes people hold back because they are scared, and called for increased LGBTQ+ representation. The show was also praised for a "multiseason queer story arc," and having a trans male character named Jewelstar who was voiced by Alex Blue Davis, a trans man. Another reviewer summarized Stevenson saying that she seeded hints toward the Catra/Adora pairing throughout the show, with the hope that once it was clear to viewers, it would be "too late for higher-ups to stop it."

High Guardian Spice
In October 2021, the creator of High Guardian Spice, Raye Rodriguez, a Cuban-American trans man, was described as being "passionate about telling diverse and inclusive stories" and noted as wanting to share "fantastical stories about queer, diverse and relatable characters," implying that such characters would be in the series. It was also noted that he was developing animated series for Legendary TV and one for Warner Bros. Animation around a DC Comics character.

When the series released on Crunchyroll on October 26, 2021, it included various LGBTQ characters. For example, Anise, the cousin of one of the protagonists, Sage, is married to an Elf woman named Aloe, with Anise voiced by a lesbian actress, Haviland Stillwell. Additionally, Professor Caraway, a professor at the High Guardian Academy, reveals in the third episode "Transformations", that he is revealed to be a trans man, and is voiced by Rodriguez. The show also includes LGBTQ cast members like trans woman Julia Kaye (who voices Snapdragon), gay man named Cam Clarke (who voices Neppy Cat and Sorrel), and ambiguously queer Julian Koster (who voices Slime Boy).

In a November 2021 interview, Rodriguez noted the importance of representation, and voiced optimism for inclusivity in animation, praising Steven Universe for breaking "so many boundaries." He also stated that the series centers on four girls who aren't princesses or chosen ones, but go on adventures, and said it is inspired by a lot of his close friendships. He further praised Crunchyroll for not having any pushback to LGBTQ representation in the show, even though there is homophobia and transphobia in the show's world, adding that in that world, "people are generally a lot more chill about LGBTQ+ people than they are in real life."

Other young adult animations
On February 28, 2020, Devon Giehl, lead writer of The Dragon Prince, said that the writers intended for the romantic interest between Amaya and Janai to start at the end of season 3, and explicitly confirmed them as lesbian characters who like each other.

In September 2020, Amber Vanich, a story revisionist for Rapunzel's Tangled Adventure revealed that Cassandra "Cass" was gay coded, with sapphic looks toward the story's protagonist, Rapunzel, and that some of these feelings are shown in the episode about memory loss. She also said that there were many "queer women who boarded scenes [of] Cassandra," and that women-love-women vibes were ingrained in every drawing she did of the character. These beliefs were also reflected by Klaudia Amenábar of The Mary Sue, calling Cass an "extremely gay-coded sword lesbian best friend" of Rapunzel. Earlier in the year, the series creator of Tangled, Chris Sonnenberg, said he'd be willing to produce a spinoff show focusing on Cass, "if the call came." The year before, in November, he called Cass a strong female character and talked about the "real friendship bond" between her and Rapunzel in September of the same year.

All-ages animation
The 2020s saw the premiere of all-ages animated series on HBO Max, the Disney Channel, Cartoon Network, Nickelodeon, and other platforms with LGBTQ characters. This included series which ended in 2020 like Steven Universe Future, and those which ended in 2021 included Adventure Time: Distant Lands, DuckTales, Big Hero 6: The Series, Carmen Sandiego, and City of Ghosts. Currently, ongoing all-ages animations with recurring LGBTQ characters include The Owl House, The Loud House, Rugrats, Ridley Jones, Dead End: Paranormal Park and The Proud Family: Louder and Prouder.

Adventure Time: Distant Lands

In the summer of 2020, the Adventure Time: Distant Lands series, the name for four hour-long streaming television specials based on the American animated television series Adventure Time, began streaming on HBO Max. On June 25, the first episode of that series dropped. This episode, titled "BMO," introduced Y5, an anthropomorphic rabbit and teenage scientist between age 11 and 13 who lives in The Drift. Originally named "Y4", Y5 chooses her new name with BMO's encouragement and eventually becomes the robot's "deputy." Y5 struggles with managing the expectations of her parents (voiced by Tom Kenny and Michelle Wong, respectively), and finds herself forced to disobey them in order to save the Drift—all the while discovering her own identity. Y5—with the titular robot's assistance—helps the citizens of the Drift defeat Hugo, and after their overlord is dethroned, she proposes a new form of social organization based on cooperation that will ideally allow the Drift to flourish.

Voice actress Glory Curda later argued that Y5's story has a lot of context and is representative of coming out into your own identity and defining yourself with whatever terms are comfortable for you. Curda, in a Q&A on Reddit, said that after BMO left, Y5 grew and developed into "a leader and trailblazer to help save the drift."

On November 19, 2020, "Obsidian," the second episode of Adventure Time: Distant Lands aired on HBO Max. It brought together Marceline "Marcy" Abadeer, Bonnibel "Bonnie" Bubblegum, and Glassboy, the latter who is voiced by Michaela Dietz, who voiced Amethyst in Steven Universe. In this special, Marcy, living with Bonnie, is anxious about revisiting the Glass Kingdom as it holds bad memories, but she and Bonnie are forced to confront this "rocky past" as they face off against an ancient, dangerous, and powerful dragon. Marcy is a confirmed bisexual character, as she dated male characters in the past, while Bonnie is more ambiguous, as her exact sexuality has not yet been confirmed. A few days before the premiere, Mey Rude described Bonnie and Marcy living a "happy, gay life together" which they always deserved, and predicted that the series would be full of "action, brand new songs, and classic Adventure Time weirdness and heart." Before the episode even aired, writing for The A.V. Club, William Hughes gave this episode an A, calling it "fan service at its finest" with "plenty of the usual lovely Adventure Time touches".

After the episode aired, Rebecca Long also gave a positive review of the episode in Polygon. She wrote that the episode gives fans the "emotional payoff and answers" they have been yearning for and that the special uses the plot to explore Marceline's childhood trauma, her romantic history with Bubblegum, how the two are interconnected, and fills in gaps about her past. Long also stated that while the special is not "as offbeat" as BMO, it is heavier in terms of emotional weight and plot, and making clear that "romantic subtext" in the original show has "always been straight-up text." At the same time, she states that not all interactions between Bubblegum and Marceline are loving, that the special has flaws due to a conventional structure and storytelling, even with some "inconsistencies in Princess Bubblegum’s character design," but is still heartfelt and effective, complete with new music, with Marceline and Bubblegum having "a shared future that feels real." Rosie Knight of IGN gave a similar assessment.

Disney Channel

In January 2020, The Owl House began airing on the Disney Channel. The show dropped subtext and hints that several characters within the show are LGBTQ+.

In April 2020, the same month, DuckTales, premiered two characters, Indy and Ty, the guardians of Violet Sabrewing and the foster fathers of Lena Sabrewing, who were slated to be recurring characters. Also that month, an episode of T.O.T.S., "Seas the Day," would feature a baby dolphin named Donny, adopted by a dolphin lesbian couple.

On July 7, 2020, Dana Terrace, the creator of The Owl House, implied a romantic subtext between Amity and Luz, when responding to a fan who posted a screenshot from the upcoming episode "Enchanting Grom Fright" on Twitter, which showed one of the characters in the show, Amity Blight, putting her hands on the shoulders of Luz Noceda, the show's main protagonist, and looking into Luz's eyes. Claiming "there is no heterosexual explanation" for Amity's action, Terrace responded, "there really isn't". On August 8, 2020, the episode, written by Molly Ostertag, aired, openly presenting and confirming Disney's first animated LGBT+ female non-recurring character. In previous episodes, Luz had shown interest in male characters but had begun to grow closer to Amity. On the other hand, Amity is shown to have a crush on Luz, confirming her to be lesbian or bisexual. In the episode, Luz and Amity dance together, while casting spells, to defeat "Grom," a demon that manifests as their deepest fears. The animation supervisor for the show, Spencer Wan, hinted at this, referring to their intimate dance, which he storyboarded with Hayley Foster, as "the gay thing" and the first time he got to "do anything even remotely queer." The following day, he posted an animatic of Luz and Amity's dance scene. Amity and Luz represent Disney's first animated LGBT+ female regular characters. In the August 2020 episode of The Owl House, titled "Understanding Willow", one of the main characters (Willow Park) is shown to have two dads named Gilbert and Harvey Park. Terrace confirmed Luz as bisexual and Amity as lesbian in a Reddit AMA in September 2020.

On September 29, 2020, Samantha "Sam" King, a writer for the Season 3 episode of DuckTales, "They Put a Moonlander On the Earth!", confirmed that Lieutenant Penumbra is a lesbian character. However, King wished it had been more overt and said that people should continue to ask for better representation.

On March 17, 2021, two days after the broadcast of the series finale of DuckTales, storyboard artist Sam King, admitted that, although she did not wish to "become "Word of Board Artist" on every headcannon and ship", she would permit fans to "assume I think every character except, like, Lunaris, is LGBTQIA+ in some shape or another."

On May 12, 2021, the reboot of the early 2000s animated sitcom, The Proud Family, which is titled The Proud Family: Louder and Prouder was announced. The series will include Barry and Randall Leibowitz-Jenkins as the adoptive parents of Maya Leibowitz-Jenkins, an interracial gay couple. Michael Collins, a recurring character from The Proud Family will come out as bisexual. The executive producers of the series, Bruce W. Smith and Ralph Farquhar, said that the "show never really went away" and called it the "perfect time to bring back this show." ScreenRant argued that the revival will break down barriers through inclusion of multicultural families and characters belonging to the LGBTQ+ community.

On May 17, 2021, it was announced that The Owl House would be renewed for two more seasons. The SVP/general manager of Television Animation for Disney Channels, Meredith Roberts, said that the series creator, Dana Terrace, and her team, continue to "push the envelope with epic and diverse storylines," and said they were "eager to showcase more adventures in seasons two and three." Terrace revealed that season 2, which will directly follow the events of the season 1 finale, would consist of 21 episodes, divided into Season 2A (10 episodes) and 2B (11 episodes), while the third season will consist of three 44-minute specials.

In early June 2021, in celebration of Pride Month, Disney unveiled new merchandise and tweeted an illustration. In response, Alex Hirsch, the creator of A Disney series, Gravity Falls, criticized Disney studio executives of cutting LGBTQ scenes from their shows. In his tweet, which was retweeted thousands of times he urged people to "mercilessly" spam the executives by saying is "room for everyone under the rainbow" if the executives claim LGBTQ+ characters are not "Disney appropriate."

On July 10, 2021, The Owl House episode "Through the Looking Glass Ruins" premiered on the Disney Channel. One reviewer, Mey Rude said that the episode pushes forward the relationship between Luz and Amity, with Amity putting her job as a librarian in jeopardy to help Luz, while the latter goes through trials to get Amity her job back, and Amity kissing Luz on the cheek. Rude also noted that the LGBTQ characters in the show are "fleshed-out characters," pointed out the episode, directed by Bo Coburn, was co-written by Molly Ostertag and Terrace, with the former writing "Enchanting Grom Fright" and "Wing It Like Witches." That episode was co-written by Rachel Vine. Another reviewer described the episode as delivering a "definitive message that love transcends gender even in the world of children’s animation." The same reviewer also said that fans shouldn't look to "giant corporations for continual queer representation" and expressed their frustration at the end of The Owl House after its third season airs. Another reviewer noted that Luz and Amity were beginning to "understand their feelings for one another."

On July 24, 2021, The Owl House episode "Eda's Requiem" featured a character named Raine Whispers, who goes by they/them pronouns and is voiced by transgender and non-binary actor Avi Roque. Raine is Disney's first non-binary character. In the episode, Eda Clawthorne is shown to have feelings for Raine. The subsequent episode,  "Knock, Knock, Knockin' on Hooty's Door", which aired on July 31, reveals that Eda and Raine were formerly dating, before breaking up. The episode also has Luz and Amity asking each other out, officially becoming a couple. GLAAD praised the episode, saying they were excited to see a "wonderful and affirming message" from the series.

On October 3, 2021, one of the creators of The Ghost and Molly McGee, Bob Roth, said there is LGBTQ representation in the show, which starts small and later includes main characters, and urged fans to "let it unfold naturally." He also said that people were reading too much into the interactions between Libby and Molly McGee in one episode, assuming it is romantic. On October 5, 2021, the series introduced Ms. Roop, a history teacher at Brighton Middle School. In the episode "Mazel Tov, Libby!", she is shown slow-dancing with a woman. In the following episode "No Good Deed", she is confirmed to be a lesbian and the woman she dance with is Pam, her wife. Ms. Roop is voiced by lesbian actress Jane Lynch.

On October 5, 2021, in an AMA on Reddit, Dana Terrace, the creator of The Owl House, explained the show was cancelled not because of ratings or COVID-19 pandemic but rather because business people at Disney believed it did not fit "into the Disney brand." She stated that this was the case due to the serialized nature of the show and an audience which "skews older," rather than due to its LGBTQ+ representation, saying she wouldn't "assume bad faith" against those she works with in Los Angeles. She also noted that due to the pandemic, budgets were constrained, episodes were cut, and noted that she wasn't allowed to present a case for a fourth season, and said she believed there was a future for the show if Disney Television had "different people in charge."

In May 2022, after the series finale of Amphibia, creator Matt Braly confirmed that Sasha Waybright was bisexual. In the episode, she is shown to have a bisexual pride sticker in her car. She is voiced by Anna Akana who is a bisexual actress. The series also features Yunan and Lady Olivia, who are confirmed to be a lesbian couple in the show's finale, and implies, in the episode "All In" that Mr. X, who is voiced by a gay drag queen named RuPaul, is gay. Additionally, Ally and Jess, who run the internet video channel "IT Gals", describe themselves as "just two girlfriends", with an LGBT pride flag emoji. After the characters’ debut, lead color designer Andy Garner-Flexner gave further confirmation that the two were in a romantic relationship. It was additionally stated that Ally's color palette was based on the pansexual pride flag, while Jess' was based on the bisexual pride flag. In The Owl House episode "Clouds on the Horizon", Luz and Amity kissed each other on the lips. It is the first same-sex kiss between the main characters in a Disney animated series.

On June 29, 2022, the Baymax! episode "Mbita" featured the titular character starting a romantic relationship with another man named Yukio. He also appears in the sixth episode "Baymax". Mbita is voiced by gay comedian Jaboukie Young-White. The third episode "Sofia" features a transgender man recommending menstrual products to Baymax.

On September 21, 2022, Firebuds was released on Disney Junior and Disney+. The series features Violet’s moms Val and Viv and Axl’s dads Arnie and AJ. Val is voiced by queer actress Natalie Morales and Arnie is voiced by gay actor Stephen Guarino.

On October 15, 2022, The first The Owl House special "Thanks to Them" has Luz come out to her mother as bisexual. The special also reveals that Vee's campmate Masha is non-binary as they use they/them pronouns in their nameplate and their nails are painted in the colors of the non-binary pride flag.

Cartoon Network

On March 27, 2020, the four-part finale of its limited epilogue series of Steven Universe, Steven Universe Future, aired on Cartoon Network.  Sugar argued that the series made a point about shounen anime and kids cartoons, with the aftermath of victories generally not explored, stating that the series explores the aftermath of the victory in the Season 5 finale, with the protagonist, Steven, having to face his problems head-on. The series showed a character, Bismuth, have a crush on another character (Pearl) in the episode "Bismuth Casual." The same month, a storyboarder for the show stated that Peridot was asexual and aromantic, despite her reservations that she is only a secondary creator on the show, pleasing fans, even though she said that she didn't believe Peridot was autistic. Before (and after this point) fans had shipped Peridot with various other characters, specifically Lapis Lazuli and Amethyst, some reviewers even seeing Peridot and Lapis in a "close, loving relationship" in 2018.

In April 2020, the creator of DC Super Hero Girls, Lauren Faust, confirmed that everyone was on board with Jessica Cruz having two mothers and that she was glad it was approved.

In July 2020, Tony Cervone, a producer of Scooby Doo! Mystery Incorporated confirmed that Velma is a lesbian while James Gunn, who wrote the screenplays of Scooby-Doo and Scooby-Doo 2: Monsters Unleashed, she was "explicitly gay." She has feelings for Marcie "Hot Dog Water" Fleach. Some reviewers said that the statements by Gunn and Cervone confirmed what queer fans had thought of for years, and stated that sexuality is not static, but can evolve.

In October 2020, Jones-Quartey confirmed that Professor Venomous and Lord Boxman of OK K.O.! Let's Be Heroes were married at the end of the series.

Nickelodeon
In February 2020, The Loud House, which broadcast on Nickelodeon, featured two lesbian characters. In an episode that month, Lainey, one of Lynn's roller derby team, is dating a girl named Alice. Chandni Parekh, who voiced Alice, said this showed that The Loud House is "a pioneer and inspiring supporter of love & diversity in children’s animation."

On June 13, 2020, Nickelodeon promoted LGBTQ+ characters in shows such as SpongeBob SquarePants and The Legend of Korra. While some said this "proved" that SpongeBob was gay, Stephen Hillenberg, back in 2005, said he considered SpongeBob to be asexual, with one writer for Out writing that it is important to realize that those who are asexual and queer are "just as welcome to dawn rainbows and celebrate Pride this month."

In February 2021, Nickelodeon's Blue's Clues & You! featured an alphabet song in which the letter "P" stood for "P is full of Pride!" and featured multiple Pride flags. The same month, it was announced that Adventure Time: Distant Lands episode "BMO" had won a Kidscreen Award for Best One-Off, Special or TV Movie.

Betty Deville, mother of Phil and Lil DeVille, appears in the Rugrats reboot series, which began in May 2021. In the original series, she was married to a man Howard DeVille. In the reboot, Betty is a gay single mother. Betty is voiced by queer actress Natalie Morales. Morales described the character as a "single mom with her own business who has twins" but still hangs out with her community and friends, even casually talking about her ex-girlfriend.

In June 2021, Kevin Sullivan, a story editor for The Loud House told Insider that no one stopped him from using the word "lesbian" as part of a storyline involving Luna and Sam, her crush, and that he was proud of the whole episode. Sullivan added that the fact Luna wasn't more directly identified as lesbian was not due to pressure from Nickelodeon and that he is glad the team didn't push it further because Luna then becomes "representative of so many more young people struggling with their identity."

On October 6, 2022, Monster High: The Series premiered which features a non-binary Frankie Stein who uses they/them pronouns and Deuce Gorgon's moms Medusa and Lyra. Frankie is voiced by non-binary actor Iris Menas

Other all-ages animations
In February 2020, an episode of the children's television series, Clifford the Big Red Dog aired on Amazon Prime Video and PBS Kids. The episode, titled "Dogbot," featured Dr. and Ms. Mulberry, the two moms of Samantha Mulberry. Dr. Mulberry, who is a veterinarian, is voiced by Maggie Cassella, a lesbian actress. The episode was nominated for a GLAAD Media Award but The Not-Too-Late Show with Elmo was nominated for the "Outstanding Children's Programming" award at the 32nd GLAAD Media Awards instead. In August 2021, Louise Mares, Communication Science professor at the University of Wisconsin-Madison later criticized the episode, telling Insider that those kindergarteners who watched it had the takeaway to be "nice to dogs with three legs" but that the focus on human disability and acceptance was lost.

In late August 2020, creator Sara Eissa talked about a pitch for her show, Astur's Rebellion, an action-adventure which "follows the protagonist in her journey of rebellion and redemption," saying it was rejected "due to bias against elements of diversity such as POC and LGBTQ+ main characters," implying that she was talking about Crunchyroll, and its then-upcoming show High Guardian Spice. She also talked about discourse around "diverse" in the animation industry, especially those pitching "future shows," stating that the company (presumably Crunchyroll) would look at a show with "diversity" like people of color, female cast, brighter tones, and "not give it a chance" because it won't be profitable. She further criticized "progressive looking white women" for ruining the chances of people of color to pitch shows and argued that they only hire other White people, saying they are advertising diversity, not normalizing it, and stated that she will continue to work on Astur's Rebellion going forward.

In February 2021, in Instagram Live interview, Duane Capizzi, the showrunner of Carmen Sandiego, said that it was intentional that Le Chevre (also known as Jean Paul) and El Topo (also known as Antonio) were together, and that they were always seen as a pair, and confirmed them as a couple, saying their philosophy was to "show, and not tell." He also called them villains which are "sweet," which you "can't help but love." A few months later, an animator for the show said that they were "given explicit directions" to make Le Chevre and El Topo, in their scenes together, "romantic and intimate."

On March 5, 2021, the first season of City of Ghosts introduced Thomas, a 7-year old non-binary child, and skater, who goes by they/them pronouns. Thomas is voiced by transgender child actor Blue Chapman. In the fourth episode "Tovaangar", Jasper is shown to have two moms.

In May 2021, it was reported that a non-binary okapi named Odee Elliott, would appear in the season 3 Pride-themed episode of Madagascar: A Little Wild, titled  "Whatever Floats Your Float." In the episode, none of the floats seem right for Odee, and Odde later sings a song titled "Be Proud" about being proud of your identity. Odee's voice actor, Iris Menas, a non-binary person, said the episode resonated with hir, calling it "spot on," positively impacting those who are non-binary and everyone else, with the episode's biggest takeaway being "acceptance and love and celebration." GLAAD consulted on the episode, with Jeremy Blacklow, GLAAD's director of entertainment media, saying that episode shows parents and kids that there is a "place for everyone," and arguing that episode comes at a time that "LGBTQ inclusion in kids and family programming is rapidly growing," specifically mentioning that DreamWorks Animation is working with GLAAD to "ensure that all families are represented on-screen."

On July 13, 2021, Ridley Jones, an animated series by Chris Nee, who created Doc McStuffins and Vampirina premiered on Netflix, part of a slate of animated preschool series on the streaming service, with others including Spirit Rangers and Ada Twist, Scientist, of which Nee is the showrunner. Ridley Jones includes Fred, a non-binary bison who prefers they/them pronouns, the first non-binary character in a kids show on Netflix. Fred is also voiced by Iris Menas as confirmed by Nee.

In September 2021, it was reported that the preschool series on HBO Max, Little Ellen, would feature same-sex couples. On September 14, 2021, Larissa Logan Robin Frost, also known by their handle LariUmbreon, announced the cancellation of the planned animated adaptation of Rain. The series had been noted in December 2020 by Jocelyn Samara DiDomenick, the author of Rain who linked to a teaser trailer, announcing that it was in production. LariUmbreon on the other hand, had announced that she would have voiced the character, Rain. The official YouTube channel for the series described it as a "story for boys, girls, and everyone in between."

In June 2022, Dead End: Paranormal Park aired on Netflix. The series was originally scheduled for a Fall 2021 premiere. However, it was later revealed the series would be debuting sometime in 2022. On August 17, 2020, Margaret Evans interviewed Hamish Steele, creator of Dead End: Paranormal Park, about LGBTQ characters in his show. Steele explained how the show changed from its original iteration on Cartoon Hangover in 2014, and the graphic novels that followed it, stating that he is grateful for showrunners who fought for LGBTQ characters in their shows, adding that there was "absolutely no pushback from Netflix about representation," while describing Barney as a trans male character. He also hoped that the show will help out "more trans creators getting their chance to tell their stories" while hinting at other LGBTQ characters in the show apart from Barney, noting the performance of Miss Coco Peru on the show as Pauline Phoenix.

In February 2023, Work It Out Wombats! premiered on PBS Kids. The series was made with the intention of being diverse and representing all kinds of family dynamics, whether it be raised by grandparents (like the wombats) or having divorced parents with joint custody of their child (like Sammy the snake). This includes Duffy and Leiko, the lesbian kangaroo mothers of an adopted tarsier daughter named Louisa.

Animated films

In the 2020s, various animated films with LGBTQ characters were released on physical formats, in theaters, and on streaming platforms. This included LGBTQ characters in Superman: Red Son, Onward, Justice League Dark: Apokolips War, and Out. Some implied there were gay undertones in Luca.

On February 25, 2020, in the animated  direct-to-video animated superhero film Superman: Red Son, Wonder Woman's bisexuality would be on screen, with her as a voice for the LGBTQ community.

On March 6, 2020, Onward, computer-animated urban fantasy adventure film, was released. In the film, Officer Specter briefly appears and in one scene she discusses her girlfriend's daughter pulling her hair out. She is voiced by Lena Waithe, a lesbian actress.

On May 5, 2020, the direct-to-video animated superhero film Justice League Dark: Apokolips War would premiere, featuring John Constantine and King Shark as characters. Constantine's voice actor, Matt Ryan, would describe Constantine Shark as in a gay relationship.

On May 22, 2020, an animated short film titled Out premiered on Disney+. This short Pixar film revolves around Greg attempting to hide a framed photo of him and his boyfriend, Manuel, from his parents, out of fear for their disapproval. The seventh short film in the SparkShorts series, it is both Disney's and Pixar's first short to feature a gay main character and storyline, including an on-screen same-sex kiss.

In February 2021, Deadline reported that the film adaptation of Nimona was cancelled due to the shutdown of Blue Sky Studios. Webcomics commenter Gary Tyrrell criticized the decision, saying, "[Disney] could have allowed a very different kind of young heroine... I mourn for those who would have found a vision of themselves in an animated version". Sources told CBR that the film was "75% complete". Anonymous staffers at Blue Sky interviewed by Business Insider bemoaned the cancellation of the film, calling it "heartbreaking," arguing that the film "didn't look like anything else in the animated world," and saying that they believe it will never "be completed and released." A few staffers confirmed to BuzzFeed News that the film had an "I love you" scene between Blackheart and Goldenloin. In June 2021, Mey Rude, a writer for Out, said she still held out "hope that this film…will find its way back to life somehow." In July 2021, Meggie Gates in Bitch, said the film would have been Disney's first "legitimately queer film" and could have been a turning point "for how the corporation handles queerness" but that the Disney chose to "bury its gays" by cancelling the film, a blow to queer Disney fans. In April 2022, it was announced Netflix revived the film and will be releasing it in 2023.

In June 2021, Luca was released on Disney+. Some argued that the film felt "gay" even if not "explicitly queer," and more ambiguous, comparing it to the 2020 animated film, Wolfwalkers. Others said that Luca and Alberto hiding their true sea monster identities as an allegory for people who are members of the LGBTQ+ community, feeling as though they need to hide their true selves in order to be accepted. The film's director, Enrico Casarosa, said this was unintentional and that his original vision for the film was to explore the time in a child's life before romance, but he has since welcomed the interpretation after the film's release, also stating: "While I identify with pronouns he/him and I am a straight man, the themes of diversity, acceptance and inclusion in our movie are dear to my heart".

On March 10, 2022, Pixar employees argued that "nearly every moment" of openly gay affection was cut due to demands from Disney executives, even if creative teams and Pixar executives objected, arguing that these employees are being barred from creating queer content in animated films. Some critics countered that Pixar also downplayed queer moments in films like Luca and Turning Red.

It was later reported in mid-March 2022 that a same-sex kiss in Lightyear, which was released on June 17, was reinstated, with the film featuring the studio's "first-ever on-screen kiss between two characters of the same gender" between Alisha Hawthorne and her wife Kiko. At the same time, Lilith, Eda's older sister in  The Owl House, was confirmed to be aromatic asexual. Jade King of The Gamer noted that Cissy Jones said that her letter during a charity stream saying that Lilith didn't have any romantic attractions was "basically canon," further confirming those identities.

On October 4, 2022, the direct-to-video film Trick or Treat Scooby-Doo! depicted Velma Dinkley as a lesbian who has a crush on monster designer Coco Diablo who reciprocates. The film was received by media outlets and fans. Velma Dinkley had previously been depicted as a lesbian in the television series Scooby-Doo! Mystery Incorporated which ran from 2010 to 2013.

On October 28, 2022, Wendell & Wild was released on Netflix. The film features Raúl Cocolotl, a transgender boy in an all-girls Catholic school. He is the first transgender male character in a major animated film. Raúl is voiced by transgender actor Sam Zelaya.

Strange World which was released on November 23, 2022, features Ethan Clade, who is the first gay lead character in a Disney animated film. Ethan Clade is voiced by gay comedian Jaboukie Young-White.

Upcoming series
In February 2020 it was reported that Michael Vogel, a gay development executive who worked on shows like Transformers Prime and My Little Pony: Friendship is Magic, was working on a new 2D animated show for WildBrain titled Princess Alexander. The series would focus on themes of sexuality and gender while revolving around a young prince who finds out he has magical powers which "have traditionally been exclusive to princesses," even though he has "none of the natural skills that princes are supposed to have," leading to the entire kingdom and his family panicking at this discovery. Vogel said that this series targets those ages 6–9, serving as an allegory for acceptance of LGBTQ people, and that he is writing the "22-minute origin story pilot" while production was said to begin in summer 2020. WildBrain's EVP of content and current series Stephanie Betts was quoted as saying they want to "tell stories that appeal to everyone in the audience" while Vogel said that while many shows are doing a lot for diversity and inclusivity, to have a character "dealing with these issues front and center" is something he hasn't seen before.

On August 15, 2020, Lena Dean of Bitch noted that writers and showrunners have wanted to push for onscreen queer representation, but said it still risky. She hoped that in the future there would be "more meaningful representation" especially for transgender, asexual, non-binary, and "queer characters of color," noting that there is such a demand for audiences for this diversity, noting that in the past there were only "background gay characters" which meant that queer people couldn't see themselves as protagonists.

On August 17, 2020, a queer writer, Taneka Stotts, who wrote 12 episodes of Steven Universe Future, along with episodes for My Little Pony: Pony Life, Craig of the Creek, and other shows, announced her role in an unannounced show on Twitter. She described herself as  story editor on a show with "great characters, upfront queerness, and big heart" which was slated to premiere in 2022 but is currently delayed. She later clarified that it would be an animated show, and said that she wanted to be a showrunner in the future.

The comic series, Lumberjanes will premiere as an animated series on HBO Max sometime in the future, having Shannon Watters, Grace Ellis, Brooklyn A. Allen and ND Stevenson as showrunners. The original comic series is filled with LGBTQ characters, such as Jo, a trans female main character, and two other female main characters who identify as either bisexual or lesbian, Molly and Mal (both of whom have requited crushes on each other). After the announcement of the series, fellow animators, like Matt Braly of Amphibia, Rad Sechrist of Kipo and the Age of Wonderbeasts, and Shadi Petosky of Twelve Forever and Danger & Eggs praised the development. There were similar sentiments from voice actors Liam O'Brien, Sam Riegel, Aimee Carrero, Felicia Day, and Cissy Jones, among others. On October 7, Stevenson told EW about the series, saying that her "interest in lifting up and exploring queer stories" is not going anywhere. She added that she is interested in "telling central queer stories," having stories that are "built around" queer characters. The same EW story described the series in the "early development" stage with HBO Max.

Timeline of key events
 May 15, 2020: She-Ra and the Princesses of Power premieres its final season on Netflix and ends with a confirmation of the queer romance between Catra and Adora.
 June 26, 2020: The season finale of Harley Quinn airs on DC Universe and is called "one of the most gratifying gay seasons of television" for the bisexua love story between Harley Quinn and Poison Ivy.
 August 7, 2020: It is announced that Hazbin Hotel will be developed into a fully-fledged animated series on A24.
 September 2, 2020: Dana Terrace, creator of The Owl House, confirms two LGBTQ characters in the show: Luz Noceda and Amity Blight.
 September 7, 2020: It is announced that The Venture Bros. has been cancelled and will not be renewed for an eighth season.
 September 9, 2020: The Venture Bros., slated to be renewed for an eighth and final season, is cancelled,
 October 7, 2020: It is announced that an animated series based on Lumberjanes is in early development.
 October 12, 2020: The final season of Kipo and the Age of Wonderbeasts premieres on Netflix.
 October 31, 2020: The first season of Helluva Boss premieres on YouTube.
 November 19, 2020: The second episode of Adventure Time: Distant Lands airs on HBO Max, focusing on the romantic relationship between Marceline "Marcy" Abadeer and Bonnibel "Bonnie" Bubblegum.
 December 19, 2020: May Marigold confirms she is a trans woman in the Volume 8 episode of RWBY, "War."
 February 4, 2021: It is announced that the film adaptation of Nimona, with various LGBTQ characters, was cancelled due to the shutdown of Blue Sky Studios.
 May 17, 2021: It is announced that The Owl House would be renewed for two more seasons.
 April 30, 2021: The Mitchells vs. the Machines premieres on Netflix and has a subtle lesbian protagonist named Katie, voiced by Abbi Jacobson.
 July 31, 2021: Luz and Amity in The Owl House are confirmed as a romantic couple.
 August 26, 2021: Beckett Mariner tells her friend, Tendi, in an episode of Star Trek: Lower Decks that she is "always dating bad boys, bad girls, bad gender non-binary babes, ruthless alien masterminds, bad bynars," implying she is pansexual.

See also
 LGBT representation in animated web series
 LGBT representation in American adult animation
 LGBT children's television programming
 List of animated series with LGBT characters
 History of homosexuality in American film
 History of anime
 Media portrayals of bisexuality
 Media portrayal of lesbianism
 List of LGBT-related films by year
 Cross-dressing in film and television
 List of animated series with crossdressing characters
 List of anime by release date (1946–1959)

Notes

References

Citations

Sources
 

2020s animated television series
Animated television series
LGBT portrayals in mass media
LGBT characters in animation